Robert Alan Tudor (born June 30, 1956 in Cupar, Saskatchewan and raised in Dysart, Saskatchewan) is a retired professional ice hockey centre who spent parts of three seasons in the National Hockey League, playing 28 games for the Vancouver Canucks and St. Louis Blues. The bulk of his career spent in the minor Central Hockey League. Tudor played major junior hockey for the Regina Pats of the Western Canada Hockey League before being selected by the Canucks in the 1976 NHL Amateur Draft. He made his professional debut that year and first played in the NHL in 1978.

Playing career
A scrappy but somewhat undersized center, Tudor was selected 98th overall in the 1976 NHL Amateur Draft by the Vancouver Canucks following a 106-point season for the Regina Pats of the Western Hockey League. He would spend six seasons in the Canucks' system, consistently finishing as one of the highest scorers on their minor-league affiliates, but was unable to make the jump to the NHL full-time. His longest taste of NHL action came in the 1978–79 season, as he registered 4 goals and 8 points in a 24-game stint in Vancouver. He spent both the 1979 and 1980 playoffs on the Canucks' roster, appearing in 3 postseason games without scoring a point.

Released by the Canucks in 1982, Tudor signed on with the St. Louis Blues. He scored 37 goals in minor-pro, and earned another brief NHL callup, playing 2 games for the Blues in 1982–83. He would have a brief stint in Germany the following season, and a few more minor-league stops back in North America before retiring in 1986.

Altogether, Tudor appeared in 28 NHL games, recording 4 goals and 4 assists for 8 points, and added 19 penalty minutes. Tudor and his friend and junior teammate Drew Callander would have almost parallel careers - teammates for 3 seasons in Regina, they would play together for four seasons in the Canucks' system for the Dallas Black Hawks, and later also teamed up in Germany. Tudor finished his career with 8 points in 28 NHL games, Callander with 8 points in 39 NHL games.

Post-playing career
Rob coached minor hockey in Okotoks, Alberta, where his son Connor played junior Hockey.

Career statistics

Regular season and playoffs

External links

Profile at hockeydraftcentral.com

1956 births
Living people
Canadian expatriate ice hockey players in the United States
Canadian ice hockey centres
Dallas Black Hawks players
Fort Wayne Komets players
Ice hockey people from Saskatchewan
Kölner Haie players
New Haven Nighthawks players
Nova Scotia Oilers players
Regina Pats players
St. Louis Blues players
Salt Lake Golden Eagles (CHL) players
San Diego Mariners draft picks
Tulsa Oilers (1964–1984) players
Vancouver Canucks draft picks
Vancouver Canucks players